Exatlon is a reality competition series where two teams of physically fit contestants compete against each other. Following the reality TV format the show has many parts that are planned ahead. The teams are composed of athletes (current, former, Olympic etc.), sports professionals and celebrities on one team and ordinary people with athletic ability, from all walks of life on the other team. All must have strong physical skills and sporting abilities.

Exatlon is a team-oriented competition which moves to an individual mode in its final weeks, culminating in a final round where a male and female are crowned the Exatlon champions. The format finale varies in certain markets where the male and female compete for one of them to be crowned the Exatlon champion.

Exatlon first aired in Brazil on (Rede Bandeirantes) in 2017 and since then has been a rating success in Mexico (TV Azteca), Romania (Kanal D), Slovenia (Planet TV), Colombia (Canal RCN), US Hispanic (Telemundo), Hungary (TV2) and Turkey (Netflix).

Format 
An Exatlon season is stretched across 4 to 6 nights a week from a minimum of 12 weeks to as many as 31 weeks.

Each day the teams compete on specially designed parkour courses. The parkour courses are designed as head-to-head races (tête-à-tête). The first team to achieve 10 wins is crowned that day's winning team - 10 is the Winner.

Exatlon's key point of difference is its complex parkour courses that can test the most accomplished athlete. These stable parkours combine running tracks with swimming pools, hurdles, obstacles, balance beams, toboggan slides, sand & mud crawl nets, crawl tunnels, under/over bars, dropping platforms, and physical sporting mechanisms. Each parkour has a further skill-based ending that is changed according to the game requirements. The game endings are interchangeable across the parkours with over 50 possible choices. The parkours are long testing tracks that require a number of sporting skills. Each one can involve any combination of speed, swimming, jumping, balance, flexibility, strength, dexterity, coordination, muscle memory and sporting intelligence. The Exatlon parkours test all aspects of an athlete's abilities.

Individuals need to perform at their highest level consistently as this is the only way they can secure a strong position within their team rankings. These rankings are important as regularly, over the course of the series, contestants will be eliminated from either team.

Exatlon's host plays and important role in the show commentating on each parkour, guiding the viewer through each game. A unique characteristic of this sports-reality format is the sports style commentary.

The team stage 
Eight to ten Athletes in each team face-off every week, with athletes eliminated each week.

A typical week in Exatlon includes but is not limited to: the House game, the Money game and Money Smash, the Individual Medal game, the International game, the Best-of game, the Special game, the Elimination game and the Play-off game.

Once Exatlon reaches its final eight to ten athletes, the format moves from the team stage to the individual stage.

The individual stage 
The final eight to ten compete individually to crown the Exatlon Champion or Champions along with the trophy and a cash prize.

Aside from the parkour games, Exatlon also includes Quiz & Word games played once a week between the two teams.

Exatlon's format evolves in future seasons creating international tournaments and competitions across multi-national, regional and world championships.

International versions 
Legend:
 Currently airing franchise
 Franchise with an upcoming season
 Franchise no longer aired
 Status unknown

References 

Competitions